The Bejtexhinj (in Albanian sing. bejtexhi, pl. bejtexhinj; from  meaning "poem"), were popular bards of the Muslim tradition, literally meaning "couplet makers". It means the same in the Albanian literature, firstly muslim poets, that engaged in beit poetry. This genre of literature created in Albania in the 18th century that prevailed in different cities of what is now Albania, Kosovo, Chameria as well as in religious centers. 
 
The spread of Bejtexhinj was a product of two different significant factors. There was a demand in religious practices to write in Albanian and to free it from foreign influence. The other factor was the accretion of ideological pressure from Turkish rulers. The ruling Ottomans sought the submission of Albanians through the Muslim religion and culture. Albania rulers opened their own schools with many Bejtexhinj poets in attendance.

History

The Bejtexhinj wrote Albanian in the Elifba alphabet, an adaption of the Ottoman Turkish alphabet, often with heavy influence from Ottoman Turkish in the form of loanwords. Bejte literature had two development phases. The first lasted until the end of the 18th century and was characterized by secular themes. The second phase, from the end of the 18th century and through the 19th century, had a predominantly religious character. Of the secular works, many Bejtexhinj wrote about the positive values of love, natural and feminine beauty, virtues, works, knowledge and also alluded to the negative traits of ambition and hypocrisy.
 
Bejtexhinj who worked in this vein were Nezim Frakulla, Sulejman Naibi and Muhamet Kyçyku. A further step in the literature was initiated when other Bejexhinj such as Hasan Zyko Kamberi and Zenel Bastari reflected on the events of the time, describing the hard lives of the poor, the insecurities of the future, and their discontent at the conditions of feudalism.
 
The literature of the Bejtexhinj did not achieve national prestige on its own, but the poets provided a valuable addition to Albanian literature. They wrote in Albanian, for example, at a time when it was banned by the ruling Ottomans. Aside from its religious themes, Bejte literature was the first to widely utilize secular themes. Some authors of this type were closer to the people and included in their poems elements of daily life, using realistic social themes with a strong critical sensibility.

Importance

With Bejtexhinj works, Albanian poetry made another step artistically, being composed of expressions and imagery that are truly artistic in value. Bejtexhinj authors also blended Albania's traditional poetry, mainly the eight-line poems that all poets used. Their works were spread through written copies or verbally. The number of poets that this era produced is considerably large coming from cities such as Berat, Elbasan, Shkodër, Gjakova, Pristina, and smaller towns as Kolonjë, Frashër, and Konispol.
 
The flow of Bejtexhinj literature lost its influence at the beginning of the 19th century, but in some places like Kosovo, this tradition lasted even longer from authors such as Maliq Rakoveci and Rexhep Voka.

References

Sources 

 
 
 
 

Albanian literature
Kosovan literature
Islamic poetry